The 2019 Utah State Aggies football team represented Utah State University in the 2019 NCAA Division I FBS football season. The Aggies were led by head coach Gary Andersen in his fifth overall season, although first season after taking over as the program's head coach for the second time. The team played their home games at Maverik Stadium, and competed as members of the Mountain Division of the Mountain West Conference.

Previous season
The Aggies finished the 2018 season with an 11–2 overall record, going 7–1 in conference  play to tie for first place in the Mountain Division with Boise State. The team was invited to the 2018 New Mexico Bowl where they defeated North Texas 52–13. Head coach Matt Wells was hired by Texas Tech shortly after the season ended, and Gary Andersen was named his replacement on December 9, 2018. Andersen had previously coached at Utah State from 2009 to 2012.

Preseason

Award watch lists
Utah State had five players placed on eleven different award watch lists heading into the 2019 season.

Preseason All-Americans
Utah State had three players named as preseason All-Americans by various publications.

Mountain West media days
Mountain West Media Days were held on July 23–24 at the Green Valley Ranch resort in the Las Vegas suburb of Henderson, Nevada.

In the preseason media poll, the Aggies were predicted to finish second in the Mountain Division.

Media poll

Preseason All-Mountain West Team
Jordan Love was selected as the Preseason Offensive Player of the Year at MWC Media Days. Utah State had four additional players selected to the preseason all-Mountain West team.

Personnel

Coaching staff
The 2019 Aggie coaching staff included ten new coaches as a result of Matt Wells' departure and the subsequent rehiring of Gary Andersen. Only Frank Maile and Stacy Collins remained from the previous staff. Of the ten new coaches, two had previous experience at Utah State (Gary Andersen and TJ Woods), and two were former Aggie football players (Keegan Andersen and Bojay Filimoeatu).

Source:

Roster
Source:   2019 Fall Camp Football Roster

Depth chart

Schedule

Game summaries

at Wake Forest

Stony Brook

at San Diego State

Colorado State

at LSU

Nevada

at Air Force

BYU

at Fresno State

Wyoming

Boise State

at New Mexico

vs Kent State (Frisco Bowl)

Rankings

Players drafted into the NFL

References

Utah State
Utah State Aggies football seasons
Utah State Aggies football